Kokomo Municipal Airport  is five miles northeast of Kokomo, in Howard County, Indiana. It is owned by the Kokomo Board of Aviation Commissioners.  The FAA's National Plan of Integrated Airport Systems for 2009–2013 categorized it as a general aviation facility.

The first airline flights were Delta DC-3s in late 1947; Turner (Lake Central) arrived about 1950 and successor Allegheny pulled out in 1969-70.
The Kokomo, Logansport, and Peru area was eligible for essential air service funding until the year 1989

Facilities
It has two asphalt runways: 5/23 is 6,001 by 150 feet (1,829 x 46 m) and 14/32 is 4,002 by 150 feet (1,220 x 46 m).

In 2014 the airport had an average of 30 flight operations per day: 93% general aviation, 4% military, and 3% air taxi. 50 aircraft were then based at this airport: 90% single-engine, 4% multi-engine, 2% jet and 4% helicopter.

References

External links 
 Airport page at City of Kokomo website
 Aerial photo from Indiana DOT
 Aerial image as of 24 March 1998 from USGS The National Map
 

Airports in Indiana
Transportation buildings and structures in Howard County, Indiana
Former Essential Air Service airports
Kokomo, Indiana